Fridman is a surname. Notable people with the surname include:

 Aleksandr Fridman
 Fridman (crater), the remains of a lunar crater on the far side of the Moon
 Alexey Maksimovich Fridman, a Russian/Soviet-Israeli physicist
 Daniel Fridman,  (born 1976, Riga), a Latvian-German chess master
 Gal Fridman, Israeli windsurfer and an Olympic gold medalist
 James Fridman, British graphic designer
 Lev Fridman (born 1969, Sverdlovsk), a Russian auto racing driver
Limor Fridman (born 1968), Israeli Olympic gymnast
 Mikhail Fridman, Russian businessman
Olga Fridman (born 1998), Ukrainian-Israeli tennis player
 Yasmin Fridman (born 1973), Israeli politician
 Yonatan Fridman (born 2003), Israeli acrobatic gymnast
 Lex Fridman (born 1986), Russian-American computer scientist and podcast host.

Fridmann 

 Dave Fridmann

Frydman 

 Achilles Frydman (1905 - 1940), a Polish chess player
  (born 1965)
 
 Jean Frydman, a French resistant and businessman
 Maurice Frydman,  (1901, Warsaw - 1976, India)
  (born 1943), French painter
 Paulino (Paulin) Frydman (1905, Warsaw - 1982, Buenos Aires), a Polish chess player
  (born 1943), French physician
 Roman Frydman (born 1948), a Polish-American economist

See also 
 Friedmann (Friedman)
 Frydman, a village in Poland

Jewish surnames
Germanic-language surnames
Yiddish-language surnames